Jeremiah Price (born February 19, 1988) is a professional gridiron football defensive end for the Jacksonville Sharks of the National Arena League (NAL).

Early life
Born the son of Alice and Jasper Price, Jeremiah attended Collins High School where he participated on the football and basketball teams. As a member of the football team, Price was named an All-State selection in 2006.  (born February 19, 1988)

College career
Price began his collegiate career at Jones County Junior College. After two stellar seasons at Jones County, Price was recruited by Louisville, Oklahoma State, South Florida, Southern Miss, UAB and West Virginia. On December 9, 2007, Price committed to Oklahoma State University.

References

External links
Oklahoma State bio
Arena Football bio

1988 births
Living people
Players of American football from Mississippi
American football defensive ends
Canadian football defensive linemen
Jones County Bobcats football players
Oklahoma State Cowboys football players
Green Bay Blizzard players
Sioux Falls Storm players
Cedar Rapids River Kings players
New Orleans VooDoo players
Jacksonville Sharks players
People from Ellisville, Mississippi